Félix Guisard (1862–1942) was a Brazilian businessman.

1862 births
1942 deaths
19th-century Brazilian businesspeople
20th-century Brazilian businesspeople
Mayors of places in Brazil